Holsted is a railway town located in the Vejen Municipality, in the Region of Southern Denmark. It was previously the seat of the Holsted Municipality.

Transport

Holsted is served by Holsted station, located on the Lunderskov-Esbjerg railway line.

Sport
Holsted Speedway Klub known as the Holsted Tigers race in the Danish Super League and are based south of Holsted at Hedevejen 1, 6670.

Notable people 
 Kræsten Iversen (1886 in the parish of Holsted - 1955) a Danish artist of paintings and painted glass windows; a member of the Bornholm school of painters and a professor at the Royal Danish Academy of Fine Arts
 Trine Jepsen (born 1977 in Holsted) a Danish singer, actress and TV presenter, sang in a duo at the  Eurovision Song Contest 1999

References

External links
 Municipality's official website

Cities and towns in the Region of Southern Denmark
Vejen Municipality